Michael Dennehy (born June 13, 1950) is a former American football player and coach.  He served as the head football coach at the University of Montana Western (1988–1990), the University of Montana (1996–1999), and Utah State University (2000–2004), compiling a career college football record of 68–62.

Playing career
As a safety on the Grizzlies' football team from 1971 to 1972, Dennehy earned first-team all-Big Sky Conference honors in 1972. He is tied for second in single-season Big Sky history with 10 interceptions in 1972, while leading the league that year, as well.  Dennehy is tied for ninth in league history with 16 career interceptions.

Coaching career
Dennehy started his college coaching career as an assistant coach for Montana State before switching to coach at high school level for a number of years. He returned to college football coaching at the University of Montana Western, a small NAIA school, before moving on to become the offensive coordinator at the University of Montana. In 1996, he was promoted to head coach of the Montana Grizzlies, but left following the 1999 season to take at post as the head coach of Utah State, replacing Dave Arslanian. In 2005 Dennehy was fired as head coach of Utah State after compiling a record of 19–37.

Dennehy became athletics director at Jefferson High School in Boulder, Montana in 2006. Dennehy resigned after the 2006–07 school year.

Head coaching record

References

1950 births
Living people
American football safeties
Montana Grizzlies football players
Montana Grizzlies football coaches
Montana State Bobcats football coaches
Montana Western Bulldogs football coaches
Utah State Aggies football coaches
High school football coaches in Montana
High school football coaches in Washington (state)
High school football coaches in Wyoming
Sportspeople from Butte, Montana